Errenteria is a railway station in Errenteria, Basque Country, Spain. It is owned by Euskal Trenbide Sarea and operated by Euskotren. It lies on the San Sebastián-Hendaye railway, popularly known as the Topo line.

History 
The station opened in 1912 as part of the San Sebastián-Hendaye railway. It was one of the most important stations on the line, as the main depot of the railway was located here. After the construction of the Araso depot in Irun, the depot at Errenteria was gradually taken out of service between 2015 and 2016.

Services 
The station is served by Euskotren Trena line E2. It runs every 15 minutes during weekdays and weekend afternoons, and every 30 minutes on weekend mornings.

References

External links
 

Euskotren Trena stations
Railway stations in Gipuzkoa
Railway stations in Spain opened in 1912